"Peter Piper" is an English-language nursery rhyme and well-known alliteration tongue-twister. It has a Roud Folk Song Index number of 19745.

Lyrics
The traditional version, as published in John Harris' Peter Piper's Practical Principles of Plain and Perfect Pronunciation in 1813, is:

 Peter Piper picked a peck of pickled peppers,
 A peck of pickled peppers Peter Piper picked;
 If Peter Piper picked a peck of pickled peppers,
 Where’s the peck of pickled peppers Peter Piper picked?

Common modern versions include:
Peter Piper picked a peck of pickled peppers. 
 If Peter Piper picked a peck of pickled peppers,
How many pickled peppers did Peter Piper pick?

Origins
The earliest version of this tongue-twister was published in Peter Piper's Practical Principles of Plain and Perfect Pronunciation by John Harris (1756–1846) in London in 1813, which includes a one-name tongue-twister for each letter of the alphabet in the same style. However, the rhyme was apparently known at least a generation earlier. Some authors have identified the subject of the rhyme as Pierre Poivre, an eighteenthcentury French horticulturalist and government administrator of Mauritius, who once investigated the Seychelles' potential for spice cultivation.

Peter Piper Principle

The Peter Piper Principle is a cognitive error that people make, where they tend to confuse two words that resemble each other; in particular, when the first letter(s) are the same.  Studies have shown that this applies when people confuse the names of other people (although other tendencies also apply).

Novelists are well aware of the peril of giving two characters names that start with the same letter, because readers have a tendency to get them confused. Names of medications also tend to be confused when they start with the same few letters.

References

External links

Text of Peter Piper's Practical Principles of Plain and Perfect Pronunciation at Project Gutenberg
 

Tongue-twisters
English nursery rhymes
English folk songs
English children's songs
Traditional children's songs
Nursery rhymes of uncertain origin
Songs based on children's songs
Songs about fictional male characters